Henry John Bagge (15 September 1896 – 27 April 1967) was an English professional footballer who made over 170 appearances in the Football League for Fulham as a wing half. He later managed Spanish clubs Athletic Bilbao, Salamanca and RB Linense. He was described as "a consistent player who feeds his forwards with discrimination".

Personal life 
In December 1915, over a year after Britain's entry into the First World War, Bagge attested in the Royal Naval Air Service. He served as an Air Mechanic 2nd Class through the war and later in the Royal Air Force, before being transferred to the RAF Reserve in March 1919.

Career statistics

References

External links

 Harry Bagge at athletic-club.eus

1896 births
1967 deaths
English footballers
Fulham F.C. players
English football managers
English expatriate football managers
Athletic Bilbao managers
UD Salamanca managers
Footballers from Tottenham
Northfleet United F.C. players
Southern Football League players
Athletic Bilbao footballers
Royal Air Force personnel of World War I
Association football wing halves
English expatriate sportspeople in Spain
Segunda División managers
La Liga managers
Expatriate football managers in Spain
Royal Naval Air Service personnel of World War I
Royal Air Force airmen
Royal Navy sailors